Banks is the second solo studio album by Paul Banks, the lead singer of the band Interpol. It was released on October 22, 2012. The first single is the opening track, "The Base", which spent 7 weeks on the Mexico Ingles Airplay chart, peaking at #43.

Recording
Banks was recorded in New York and Connecticut with producer Peter Katis.

Reception
Banks has received mostly positive reviews from music critics. At Metacritic, which assigns a weighted average rating out of 100 to reviews from mainstream critics, the album received an average score of 65, based on 23 reviews, which indicates "generally favorable reviews".

Track listing
The track listing was announced by NME, on August 6, 2012.

Chart performance

References

2012 albums
Matador Records albums
Paul Banks (American musician) albums